The Tennessean was a named passenger train jointly operated by the Norfolk and Western Railway (N&W) and the Southern Railway (SOU). Inaugurated on May 17, 1941, its route ran from Washington, DC, to Lynchburg, Virginia, on the SOU, then on to Bristol, Tennessee, on the N&W, terminating at Memphis Union Station via the SOU.  The St. Louis Southwestern Railway inaugurated a new passenger train, the Morning Star from Memphis to Dallas, specifically to provide close connections with the Tennessean at Memphis.

Intended to replace the Memphis Special as the preeminent carrier on the Washington–Memphis run, one of its critical duties was the transportation of mail for the Railway Mail Service division of the Post Office Department. The train's almost immediate success was further bolstered by a sharp rise in passenger traffic during World War II. The Tennessean carried a Bristol-Nashville sleeping car, a Chattanooga-Memphis sleeper, and a New York-Memphis sleeper.  The heavyweight Pullman sleeping cars were painted silver to help them blend in with the train's stainless-steel, streamlined baggage cars, dining cars, coaches, and observation cars. Following World War II, streamlined sleeping cars replaced the heavyweight sleepers on the Tennessean.

The amenities provided on the Tennessean were gradually curtailed as Southern Railway attempted to reduce operating losses. By the early 1960s, the train carried only coaches and a single Pullman sleeper, in addition to the railway post office car and  express and mail cars. Due to a decline in overall ridership, and Southern Railway's determination to escape the expensive burden of operating Memphis Union Station, the Tennessean was discontinued on March 30, 1968. This discontinuance ended all Southern Railway passenger train service to Memphis, allowing abandonment of Memphis Union Station.

References

Bibliography

External links
Southern Railway Tennessean
Memphis Union Station
December 1952 schedule at Streamliner Schedules

Named passenger trains of the United States
Passenger trains of the Norfolk and Western Railway
Passenger trains of the Southern Railway (U.S.)
Passenger rail transportation in Delaware
Passenger rail transportation in Maryland
Passenger rail transportation in New Jersey
Passenger rail transportation in New York (state)
Passenger rail transportation in Tennessee
Passenger rail transportation in Virginia
Passenger rail transportation in Pennsylvania
Railway services introduced in 1941
1968 disestablishments in the United States
Night trains of the United States
Railway services discontinued in 1968